Per Tony Robin Jansson (born 15 November 1991) is a Swedish professional footballer who plays as a centre back for Orlando City in Major League Soccer.

Professional career

Early career
Jansson began his career with BK Häcken, starting in their youth academy and making his professional debut on 19 May 2010 in a Svenska Cupen third round game against Östersunds FK, his only appearance of the season. He went on loan to Division 1 Södra side FC Trollhättan for the 2011 season before leaving Häcken at the end of the year.

He spent several seasons in the fifth tier with semi-professional outfit Bengtsfors IF before returning to the third tier with IK Oddevold. During this time, Jansson also had to work a second job in a horseshoe factory.

AIK
Jansson signed for Allsvenskan team AIK in April 2018 and made his debut against Örebro SK on 18 April 2018. Having joined from the Swedish third division as emergency injury cover, Jansson was a surprise success at AIK, featuring as a regular starter in one of the league's best defensive teams. On 11 November 2018, he scored the decisive goal in a 1–0 win over Kalmar FF as the team secured the Allsvenskan title for the first time in nine years.

Orlando City
On 12 March 2019 it was announced Jansson had signed with MLS side Orlando City. He made his debut on 23 March in a 1–0 win away to New York Red Bulls. He scored his first goal for the team on June 13 in a 3–1 U.S. Open Cup win over Memphis 901. On 27 October 2021, Jansson surpassed 7,693 minutes played for Orlando City, breaking the previous club record for minutes played by an outfield player set by Cristian Higuita in 2019. He marked the occasion with a stoppage-time goal during Orlando's 3–2 defeat to Columbus Crew.

International career
Having never played for Sweden at youth level, Jansson's league-winning form with AIK caught the eye of Janne Andersson who called him up in December 2018. He made his international debut on 8 January 2019, playing the full 90 minutes in a 1–0 friendly defeat to Finland.

Career statistics

Club

International

Honours
AIK
 Allsvenskan: 2018

Orlando City
U.S. Open Cup: 2022

References

External links
 
 

1991 births
Living people
Swedish footballers
Sweden international footballers
AIK Fotboll players
Allsvenskan players
IK Oddevold players
Orlando City SC players
People from Trollhättan
Association football central defenders
Major League Soccer players
Swedish expatriate footballers
Swedish expatriate sportspeople in the United States
Sportspeople from Västra Götaland County